Ghaz Al-Shamal is an Iraqi football team based in Kirkuk, that plays in Iraq Division one.

Managerial history
  Walid Mohammed Qader
  Karim Qambel
  Mohammed Qasim
  Jumah Jodaya
  Natiq Haddad

Honours

Women's team
Iraqi Women's Football League
Winners (1): 2015–16

See also
 2012–13 Iraq FA Cup
 2015–16 Iraq FA Cup
 2020–21 Iraq FA Cup

References

External links
 Team's profile on Goalzz.com

2004 establishments in Iraq
Football clubs in Kirkuk